Leiobunum blackwalli is a species of harvestman. It is found in Europe.

Leiobunum blackwalli grows to 6 mm in females and 4 mm in males. The second pair of legs grow to 50mm. Similar in appearance to L. rotundum, the abdomen is broader at the rear and the dark marking broader at the rear than the front with a sharper cutoff than L. rotundum, and the palps are pale.

This harvestman is widespread throughout Britain and Europe, though less common than L. rotundum. It is usually found in woods or damp places, and also in gardens.

References

External links
 Leiobunum blackwalli, Spider and Harvestman Recording Scheme website
 

Harvestmen
Animals described in 1861
Arachnids of Europe
Taxa named by Richard Henry Meade